Bad Ronald is the only studio album by American rap-rock band Bad Ronald. It was released on September 11, 2001 by Warner Bros. Records.

Track listing
"Let's Begin (Shoot The Sh**)"
"Bad Idea"
"All A Dream"
"I Need Love"
"Delivery"
"Hand On The Wheel"
"Lost On Tour"
"1st Time"
"Jamie"
"EZ Decision"
"Popcorn T******"
"Imagine"
"My Two Sense"
"Bank"
"Let's Begin (Shoot The Sh**) (Rock Remix)"
"American Way"

External links
[ Bad Ronald] at Allmusic

2001 debut albums
Albums produced by David Kahne
Bad Ronald (band) albums
Warner Records albums